Broadway Local is the name of the following subway services in New York City:
 (Broadway-Seventh Avenue Local)
 (Broadway Local)
 (Broadway Local)
Broadway Brooklyn Local, former service between Manhattan and eastern Brooklyn